Hugh II of Burgundy (1084 – c. 6 February 1143) was Duke of Burgundy between 1103 and 1143. Hugh was son of Odo I, Duke of Burgundy. Hugh was selected custos for the monastery of St. Benigne, and this office would be held by his descendants until the end of the twelfth century.

Marriage and issue
He married, c 1115, Matilda of Mayenne, daughter of Walter, Count of Mayenne and Adelina de Presles.

They had the following:
 Aigeline (b.1116), married Hugh I, Count of Vaudemont
 Clemence (b.1117), married Geoffrey III of Donzy
 Odo II, Duke of Burgundy, (1118–1162) married Maria of Champagne
 Gauthier, Archbishop of Besançon (1120–1180)
 Hugh le Roux (1121–1171) married Isabel of Chalon
 Robert, Bishop of Autun (1122–1140)
 Henry, Bishop of Autun (1124–1170)
 Raymond, Count of Grignon (1125–1156) married Agnes of Montpensier
 Sibylla (1126–1150), married Roger II of Sicily
 Ducissa (b.1128), married Raymond de Grancy
 Matilda (1130–1159), married William VII of Montpellier
 Aremburge (b.1132), Nun

Ancestry

References

Sources

See also
 Dukes of Burgundy family tree

References
 Bourchard, C.B. Sword, Miter and Cloister: Nobility and the Church in Burgundy 980-1198, 1987
 Richard, J. Annales de Bourgogne, 1958

House of Burgundy
Dukes of Burgundy
1084 births
1143 deaths